Popes Peak is a mountain on the border of Alberta and British Columbia in Western Canada, on the Continental Divide of the Americas, part of the Bow Range of the Canadian Rockies between Lake Louise Valley and Cataract Brook, bordering Banff and Yoho national parks.

The peak was named in 1887 after John Henry Pope, a member of the 1st Canadian Parliament. It was originally known as Boundary Peak for the borders running through it, just south of Kicking Horse Pass

The mountain was first climbed in 1903 by George Collier and his brother Joseph, guided by Christian Kaufmann.

Geology

Popes Peak is composed of sedimentary rock laid down during the Precambrian to Jurassic periods. Formed in shallow seas, this sedimentary rock was pushed east and over the top of younger rock during the Laramide orogeny.

Climate

Based on the Köppen climate classification, Popes Peak is located in a subarctic climate zone with cold, snowy winters, and mild summers. Winter temperatures can drop below −20 °C with wind chill factors below −30 °C.

See also
 List of peaks on the British Columbia–Alberta border
 List of mountains in the Canadian Rockies

Gallery

References

Three-thousanders of Alberta
Three-thousanders of British Columbia
Canadian Rockies
Borders of British Columbia
Borders of Alberta
Great Divide of North America
Mountains of Banff National Park
Mountains of Jasper National Park